Virginia College of Medicine may refer to:

 University of Virginia 
 University of West Virginia, College of Medicine
 Medical College of Virginia